Hilton Village is an unincorporated community in Fayette County, West Virginia, United States.

It is located on the Midland Trail, part of U.S. Route 60, west of the town of Rainelle.

References 

Unincorporated communities in West Virginia
Unincorporated communities in Fayette County, West Virginia